Jaiber Jiménez Ramírez (born 7 January 1995) is a Mexican professional footballer who plays as a left-back for Liga MX club Cruz Azul.

Career statistics

Club

Honours
Cruz Azul
Liga MX: Guardianes 2021
Campeón de Campeones: 2021
Supercopa de la Liga MX: 2022

References

External links
 
 
 

Living people
1995 births
Association football defenders
Cruz Azul footballers
Cruz Azul Hidalgo footballers
Liga MX players
Footballers from Oaxaca
People from Oaxaca City
Mexican footballers